Tales from the Vienna Woods is a 1979 Austrian-German drama film directed by Maximilian Schell. The film was adapted from the play by Ödön von Horvath. It was selected as the Austrian entry for the Best Foreign Language Film at the 52nd Academy Awards, but was not accepted as a nominee. It was the final film for veteran actress Lil Dagover who started her film career in the 1910s.

Plot
In Vienna, in 1930, a young woman falls in love with a gambler and leaves her fiancé, a common butcher. They become a couple and have a baby, but he gets bored and leaves them. Without means to support herself, her downfall begins.

Cast
 Birgit Doll as Marianne
 Hanno Pöschl as Alfred
 Helmut Qualtinger as Zauberkönig
 Jane Tilden as Valerie
 Adrienne Gessner as Alfred's Grandmother
 Götz Kauffmann as Oskar
 André Heller as Hierlinger
 Norbert Schiller as Rittmeister
 Eric Pohlmann as Mister
 Robert Meyer as Erich
 Lil Dagover (in her last film role) as Helene
 Martha Wallner as Alfred's Mother

See also
 List of submissions to the 52nd Academy Awards for Best Foreign Language Film
 List of Austrian submissions for the Academy Award for Best Foreign Language Film

References

External links
 

1979 films
1979 drama films
Austrian drama films
West German films
1970s German-language films
Films directed by Maximilian Schell
Austrian films based on plays
Films set in 1929
Films set in 1930
Films set in 1931
Constantin Film films
German drama films
1970s German films